Nihal Bhareti was a popular radio announcer with the Sri Lanka Broadcasting Corporation in  Colombo. He joined Radio Ceylon in the 1960s. His mellow voice attracted hundreds of fans in Sri Lanka as well as on the Indian sub-continent.

Bhareti joined the station when it was popular across South Asia. Radio Ceylon ruled the airwaves and millions tuned into the station from the vast Indian sub-continent. Bhareti's mellow voice proved popular with local listeners in Sri Lanka as well as listeners on the All Asia beam of the station.

He became part of the institution at a time when Radio Ceylon was riding the crest of the radio waves. He was appointed by Livy Wijemanne  who was by then Director of the Commercial Service of Radio Ceylon. Bhareti was mentored by senior broadcasters at the station, such as Vernon Corea who gave him his early training in the art of radio. In the early years, Nihal Bhareti assisted Vernon Corea in popular radio programmes such as Take It Or Leave It, broadcast in front of a 'live' audience, from a studio in Radio Ceylon. He was a quick learner and his adaptability coupled with a smooth, voice proved to be a hit with listeners of the Sri Lanka Broadcasting Corporation. Bhareti was a true professional.

Nihal Bhareti presented Radio Journal for a decade, this was a popular magazine programme with news, interviews, music and snippets. He was the voice behind such programmes as Holiday Choice, Housewive's Choice, and Choice of the People, on the Sri Lanka Broadcasting Corporation.' He has been in the forefront of key entertainment programmes in South Asia.Nihal Bhareti has presented the equivalent of the British radio programme 'Desert Island Discs' over the airwaves of the SLBC.Well known personalities, even Sri Lankan politicians have all been on the programme. He has interviewed many Sri Lankan music stars for the SLBC, including Nimal Mendis and Mignonne Fernando of the Jetliners.

He climbed the management ladder and he was appointed Director English Services of the Sri Lanka Broadcasting Corporation in the 1980s.

Bhareti can still be heard on the airwaves and remains a firm favourite with listeners on the island of Sri Lanka. Quite apart from his work on radio, Bhareti has compered many entertainment shows in Colombo. He has also presented entertainment programmes on Sri Lankan television.

See also
Vernon Corea
Radio Ceylon
Sri Lanka Broadcasting Corporation
List of Sri Lankan broadcasters

References

Bibliography 
 Wavell, Stuart. - The Art of Radio - Training Manual written by the Director Training of the CBC. - Ceylon Broadcasting Corporation, 1969.
 Ceylon, Radio. - Standards of Broadcasting Practice - Commercial Broadcasting Division. - Radio Ceylon, 1950.

External links 
Official Website of the Sri Lanka Broadcasting Corporation
 SLBC-creating new waves of history
Eighty Years of Broadcasting in Sri Lanka
 Mignonne Fernando to headline concert in Colombo - World Music Central
La Musique d’Yvonne - The Island Newspaper, Sri Lanka

Living people
Sri Lankan radio personalities
Sri Lankan radio executives
Year of birth missing (living people)